Ian Wynne (born 30 November 1973) is a British sprint canoer who competed in the early to mid-2000s. Competing in two Summer Olympics, he won a bronze medal in the K-1 500 m event at Athens in 2004.

In the same year he won the silver medal in the same event at  the European Championships at Poznań, Poland, as well as the bronze in the K-2 1000 m with partner Paul Darby-Dowman.

In 2005 he finished seventh in the K-1 500 m at the world championships in Zagreb, Croatia. In October 2007 he crossed the English Channel between Great Britain and France in a new record time of 2:59,06 hours.

Wynne, who was born in Tonbridge, is a member of the Royal Canoe Club. He is 184 cm (6'0") tall and weighs 84 kg (185 lbs). As a teenager he represented Great Britain in international swimming championships.

Ian Wynne is now the British men's 1000m team coach.

References
Sports-reference.com profile

1973 births
English male canoeists
Canoeists at the 2000 Summer Olympics
Canoeists at the 2004 Summer Olympics
Living people
People from Tonbridge
Olympic medalists in canoeing
Medalists at the 2004 Summer Olympics
British male canoeists
Olympic bronze medallists for Great Britain